Monarchia, often called De Monarchia ("(On) Monarchy"), is a Latin treatise on secular and religious power by Dante Alighieri, who wrote it between 1312 and 1313.  With this text, the poet intervened in one of the most controversial subjects of his period: the relationship between secular authority (represented by the Holy Roman emperor) and religious authority (represented by the Pope).  Dante's point of view is known on this problem, since during his political activity he had fought to defend the autonomy of the city-government of Florence from the temporal demands of Pope Boniface VIII. The work was banned by the Catholic Church in 1585.

Date
According to most accepted chronology, De Monarchia was composed in the years 1312–13, that is to say the time of Henry VII of Luxembourg's journey to Italy; according to another, the date of composition has to be brought back to at least 1308; and yet another moves it forward to 1318, shortly before the author's death in 1321.

Title and English editions
The title found in the extant Dante manuscripts and the editio princeps is simply Monarchia. Michele Barbi pointed this out in his introduction to the 1921 centenary edition and urged editors to adopt it. Prue Shaw has urged likewise, and done so herself, since 1995, explaining how the mistake of 'de' has come about.

An English translation by Frederick William Church was published in 1879, with Dante an Essay by his father, Richard William Church. A second translation by Philip Wicksteed was printed for private circulation in 1896. However, as neither of these editions was easily available in 1904, Aurelia Henry Reinhardt provided a new translation published by Cambridge University Press. This has been superseded by Shaw's translation, 1995.

Argument
Monarchia is made up of three books, of which the most significant is the third, in which Dante most explicitly confronts the subject of relations between the pope and the emperor.  Dante firstly condemns the hierocratic conception of the pope's power elaborated by the Roman Church with the theory of the Sun and the Moon and solemnly confirmed by the papal bull Unam sanctam of 1302.  The hierocratic conception assigned all power to the pope, making his authority superior to that of the emperor: this meant that the pope could legitimately intervene in matters usually regarded as secular.

Against this hierocratic conception, Dante argued a need for another strong Holy Roman emperor, and proposed that man pursues two ends: the happiness of earthly life and that of eternal life.  Dante argues that the pope is assigned the management of men's eternal life (the higher of the two), but the emperor the task of leading men towards earthly happiness.  From this he derives the autonomy of the temporal sphere under the emperor, from the spiritual sphere under the pope—the pontiff's authority should not influence that of the emperor in his tasks.

Dante wanted to demonstrate that the Holy Roman emperor and the pope were both human and that both derived their power and authority directly from God.  To understand this it is necessary to think that man is the only thing to occupy an intermediate position between corruptibility and incorruptibility.  If it is considered that man is only made up of two parts, that is to say the soul and the body, only in terms of the soul is he incorruptible.  Man, then, has the function of uniting corruptibility with incorruptibility.  The pope and emperor were both human, and no peer had power over another peer.  Only a higher power could judge the two "equal swords", as each was given power by God to rule over their respective domains.

See also
Separation of church and state
List of authors and works on the Index Librorum Prohibitorum

References

External links
Online text (original)
Italian translation
 English translation by Aurelia Henry Reinhardt
 

14th-century Latin books
1312 books
Books in political philosophy
Secularism
Secularism in Italy
Christianity and government
14th century in the Republic of Florence
Investiture Controversy
Works about the theory of history
Monarchia
Henry VII, Holy Roman Emperor
sk:Monarchia